Vajrayudha is a 1992 Indian Kannada language action film directed by B. Ramamurthy and produced by S. R. Rajeshwari. The film stars Ramesh Aravind, Ananth Nag and Malashri. The film's music is composed by Hamsalekha.

Cast

 Ramesh Aravind
 Ananth Nag
 Malashri
 Tara
 Doddanna
 Mysore Lokesh
 M. S. Umesh
 Tennis Krishna

Soundtrack

Hamsalekha composed the background score the film and the soundtracks and penning the lyrics for the soundtracks. The album has four soundtracks.

References

1992 films
1990s Kannada-language films
Indian action films
Films scored by Hamsalekha
Films directed by B. Ramamurthy
1992 action films